Protomelas spilonotus is a species of cichlid endemic to Lake Malawi where it prefers areas with clean, rocky substrates.  This species can reach a length of  TL.  It can also be found in the aquarium trade.

References

External links 
 Photograph

spilonotus
Fish described in 1935
Taxonomy articles created by Polbot